Peter I (c. 1048 – 9 August 1078) was count of Savoy and margrave of Turin jointly with his brother Amadeus II of Savoy from c. 1060 to 1078. He ruled only nominally, as true power was in the hands of his mother, Adelaide of Susa.

Peter presided over court hearings alongside Adelaide and also issued several donation charters with her and his brothers Amadeus II of Savoy and Otto. Shortly before his death, Peter united with Bishop Cunibert of Turin in an attempt to drive Abbot Benedict II from his abbey of San Michele della Chiusa.

Peter married Agnes of Aquitaine, c.1065. They had two daughters:
Agnes (d.after 1110), who married Frederick of Montbéliard in 1080. After marrying Agnes, Frederick became margrave of Turin (r.1080-1091).
 Alice (d.ca 1111), who may have married Margrave Boniface of Vasto and Saluzzo in 1099

References
C.W. Previté-Orton, The Early History of the House of Savoy (1000–1233) (Cambridge, 1912), accessible online at:  archive.org
S. Hellmann, Die Grafen von Savoyen und das Reich: bis zum Ende der staufischen Periode (Innsbruck, 1900), accessible online (but without page numbers) at: Genealogie Mittelalter
A.M. Patrone, 'Agnes di Poitiers,' in "Dizionario Biografico degli Italiani" – Volume 1 (1960)

External links
Peter I, Graf von Savoyen (1059–1078)

Notes

1040s births
1078 deaths
11th-century Counts of Savoy